Graham Ike is an American college basketball player for Wyoming Cowboys.

Early life and high school
Ike grew up in Aurora, Colorado and attended Overland High School. He was named second team All-Colorado after averaging 17.6 points per game and 12 rebounds per game. Ike suffered a serious knee injury during his senior season at Overland. His recruitment from college basketball programs dropped off following his injury and he eventually committed to play at Wyoming.

College career
Ike missed the first half of his freshman season due to his knee injury. He played in 12 games with seven starts on the season and averaged 11.2 points and 5.4 rebounds per game. As a sophomore, Ike was named first-team All-Mountain West Conference after averaging 19.5 points and 9.6 rebounds per game. He was named the Lute Olson National Player of the Week by CollegeInsider.com on February 14, 2022, after scoring 28 points and grabbing 12 rebounds against Utah State and 25 points and with 18 rebounds against San Jose State. 

Ike was named the conference preseason player of the year entering his junior season. He suffered a leg injury during preseason practice that initially him to miss the beginning of the 2022–23 season. Midway through the year, Ike opted to sit out the season and use a medical redshirt.

References

External links
Wyoming Cowboys bio

Living people
American men's basketball players
Basketball players from Colorado
Wyoming Cowboys basketball players
Power forwards (basketball)
Sportspeople from Aurora, Colorado
Year of birth missing (living people)